Sir Thomas Rich's School is a grammar school with academy status for boys (aged 11–18) and girls (aged 16–18, in the sixth form) in Longlevens, Gloucester, England,  locally known as "Tommies". It was founded in 1666 by Sir Thomas Rich, 1st Baronet.

The school moved to a new site outside the city centre in 1964. It offers a range of teaching and sporting facilities.

History

The Will 
In Sir Thomas Rich's will of 1666 he left his Gloucester house, in Eastgate and £6,000 (a considerable sum for the time) for a school to be established for twenty poor boys in Gloucester. The money was mainly invested in farm land, with the rent paying for the running of the school. The school was opened in 1667, a year after Sir Thomas Rich's death. Sir Thomas Rich decreed that the pupils should wear "blue coats and caps according to the laudable usage of Christ Church Hospital in London." The blue drugget gown and yellow stockings were replaced in 1882 by the modern equivalent, the blue blazer. The uniform now consists of shirt, blazer (two varieties), tie (four varieties), black trousers, black socks and black or dark brown  shoes. The school moved to Barton Street in 1889.

Schooldays between 1910 and 1918 
Arthur Stanley Bullock from Longhope, who won a scholarship to Sir Thomas Rich's in about 1910, recalled his pride in starting at the school with the motto 'Garde ta foi' ('Keep your faith') on the cap badge. In his memoir, which also recalls his extraordinary experiences and narrow escapades during World War I, Arthur recorded that the headmaster at this time was called Mr E Price. Among the staff at this period, Arthur paid tribute to: 'Sherwood for arithmetic, Benfield for geography, Freeman for physics, Williams for art, West for English and history, Price for advanced English and Larcombe for mathematics.' He recalled, 'West and Larcombe stand out as absolutely brilliant'. West must have inspired Arthur's lifelong love of history - leading him to write his own historical memoir - and his excellence in mathematics - leading him to become an engineer. Larcombe was a notable author of mathematics books.

Arthur also recalls that Larcombe and a number of other teachers joined up after war was declared, and four of them were killed in action.

Modern history 
The school moved from the centre of Gloucester in May 1964. Changes included a new quadrangle of classrooms completed in 1994. The school has increased in size since 1990, with the addition of new buildings, such as a second quadrangle, sports hall, swimming pool, language block, music block, food technology block, a sixth form centre and a newly built pavilion. During 2013, the older sections underwent modernisation. During 2020 a new Economics, Entrepreneurship, Careers and Outreach Centre was built with a grant from the Clive and Sylvia Richard’s Charity of £70,000.

In February 2020 the school was awarded the National Quality Mark For Careers Guidance.

Facilities

Sports 
Opened in 1999, the sports hall is part of the STRS Sports Centre complex which provides sports facilities for the school and Longlevens. The school also has a fitness suite that students are able to join for an annual fee.

Arms

References

External links 

 Official website
 Full history of Sir Thomas Rich's School
 A potted history of the school

Grammar schools in Gloucestershire
Schools in Gloucester
1666 establishments in England
Educational institutions established in the 1660s
Academies in Gloucestershire
Gloucester Sir Thomas Rich's School